Liez may refer to the following places in France:

 Liez, Aisne, a commune in the department of Aisne
 Liez, Vendée, a commune in the department of Vendée